Attilio Marinoni (1892 – 18 June 1940) was an Italian racecar driver from Lodi, Lombardy.

After World War I, Marinoni joined the Alfa Romeo racing team as a mechanic. He became co-driver with Giuseppe Campari in the 1924 French Grand Prix. In an Alfa Romeo 6C, he won the 1927 Coppa Ciano and three Spa 24 Hours in a row: in 1928 with Boris Ivanowski, in 1929 with Robert Benoist, and in 1930 with Pietro Ghersi. He was promoted to chief mechanic and test driver of Scuderia Ferrari between 1934 and 1937. He died when he crashed an Alfa Romeo 158/159 Alfetta into a truck on an open highway during the war while testing for the expected 1943 season.

Racing record

Complete European Championship results
(key) (Races in bold indicate pole position) (Races in italics indicate fastest lap)

Notes
 – Not listed in the Championship as Marinoni did not start a Grand Prix in 1931
 – As a co-driver Marinoni was ineligible for championship points

24 Hours of Le Mans results

References

Italian racing drivers
Grand Prix drivers
24 Hours of Spa drivers
Ferrari people
Alfa Romeo people
Sportspeople from the Province of Lodi
Road incident deaths in Italy
1892 births
1940 deaths
European Championship drivers